Krasang is a district (amphoe) in the eastern part of Buriram province, northeastern Thailand.

Geography
Neighboring districts are (from the south clockwise) Phlapphla Chai, Mueang Buriram, Huai Rat, Satuek of Buriram Province and Mueang Surin of Surin province.

History
Originally part of tambon Song Chan of Mueang Buriram district, Krasang was made a tambon in 1937. On 26 April 1952 the three tambons Krasang, Song Chang, and Lamduan were placed together to form the minor district (king amphoe) Krasang. It was upgraded to a full district on 23 July 1958.

Administration
The district is divided into 11 sub-districts (tambons), which are further subdivided into 167 villages (mubans). Krasang is a township (thesaban tambon) which covers parts of tambon Krasang. There are a further 11 tambon administrative organizations (TAO).

References

External links
amphoe.com

Krasang